The Fort Nossa Senhora da Vitória de Massangano, popularly known as Fortress of Massangano (Fortaleza de Massangano) is located in the village-commune of Massangano, in the municipality of Cambambe, in the province of Cuanza-Norte, in Angola.

History
In this place, in 1580, the Battle of Massangano took place, in which the Portuguese forces defeated those of King Quiluange of the Kingdom of Dongo.

Later, in 1582, Portuguese forces, under the command of captain Paulo Dias de Novais, were repelled by Dongo, when they tried to penetrate the region, in search of the legendary silver mines.

This fortification was built by Novais himself or by Manuel Cerveira Pereira, according to other authors, on the banks of the Cuanza River, in 1583, with the function of extending and ensuring the Portuguese occupation in the region. In addition to marking the Portuguese military presence, this establishment guaranteed the integrity of commercial networks, including the slave trade to the American continent.

Later, in 1640, the forces of Queen Ana de Sousa Ginga attacked the Massangano Fort, but her two sisters Cambu and Fungi were imprisoned on the occasion, the latter being executed. Faced with the occupation of Luanda by the forces of the Dutch West India Company, in August 1641, it was to Massangano that the Portuguese retreated and where they resisted until the reconquest of Luanda by Salvador Correia de Sá e Benevides, in August 1648.

In Massangano, José Álvares Maciel, involved in the Inconfidência Mineira, in the 1790s, was also detained, being released there to fight for his own survival.

Until the mid-19th century, the prison and its garrison were governed by a captain-major. In 1825 governor Feo Torres reported that the population of Vila da Vitória (Massangano) was 10910 inhabitants. In 1885 it was 13500. In 1854 the town had about 600 homes and the fortress garrison numbered 12 guns and a light company of 70 men, though it had formerly consisted of two companies of militia and one of native levy.<ref>[https://books.google.com/books?id=4sFKT_pFgIsC&dq=fortress%20of%20massangano&pg=PA96 Portuguese African Colonies] in The Nautical Magazine and Naval Chronicle for 1854, p.96.</ref> 

Some buildings and the ruins of Massangano were classified as a National Monument by Provincial Decree n° 81, of April 28, 1923. They are currently in the hands of the State, assigned to the Ministry of Culture.

Features
The fort has a square plan, without bulwarks at the edges. In its walls ten gun emplacements are visible. It is accessed by a vaulted tunnel from the gate-of-arms, on the landward side. On its embankment stand the service buildings: Casa do Comando (Command House) and Quartel de Tropa'' (Barracks).

By the ramp that provides access to the fort, a stone inscription reads:

The gateway is sided by two bronze plaques which read:

and

See also
Portuguese Angola
Dutch Loango-Angola

References

External Links
Fortress of Massangano at UNESCO site.
Massangano, Kwanza Norte, Angola at HPIP.

1583 establishments in the Portuguese Empire
Portuguese forts
Portuguese Angola
Forts in Angola